Chorizopella is a monotypic genus of South African comb-footed spiders containing the single species, Chorizopella tragardhi. It was first described by R. F. Lawrence in 1947, and is found in South Africa.

See also
 List of Theridiidae species

References

Monotypic Araneomorphae genera
Spiders of South Africa
Theridiidae